Faridkot is a small village in the Punjab province of Pakistan. It is located at 30°16'30N 71°57'30E with an altitude of 129 metres and lies to the south-west of the district capital - Khanewal.

The village gained temporary notoriety  for allegedly being the hometown of "Azam Amir Kasav", one of the terrorists involved in the Mumbai attacks of 2008,. However, it turned out that this person's real name is Mohammad Ajmal Amir, and that Ajmal Amir is from a different village with the same name, Faridkot in the tehsil of Dipalpur, about 170 km to the north-east of Faridkot near Khanewal.

References

http://wikimapia.org/#lat=30.2741158&lon=71.9552994&z=15&l=0&m=a&v=2

Khanewal District